Kobo is a Bantu language spoken in the Democratic Republic of the Congo. It is approximately equidistant between Nande and Hunde, but isn't intelligible with either.

Writing system

References

Great Lakes Bantu languages
Languages of the Democratic Republic of the Congo